Jarqoʻrgʻon is a city in Surxondaryo Region, Uzbekistan. It is the capital of Jarqoʻrgʻon District. The population was 17,687 in 1989, and 22,700 in 2016. The 12th century Jarkurgan minaret is located in the village Minor, some 5 km southwest of Jarqoʻrgʻon.

References

Populated places in Surxondaryo Region
Cities in Uzbekistan